Henry Blackman may refer to:

 Henry Blackman (baseball) (18911924), American baseball player
 Henry E. Blackman (born 1820), American farmer and politician

See also
 Henry Black (disambiguation)
 Harry Black (disambiguation)